The 2005 NAIA Division I women's basketball tournament was the tournament held by the NAIA to determine the national champion of women's college basketball among its Division I members in the United States and Canada for the 2004–05 basketball season.

Union (TN), playing in its home town of Jackson, defeated Oklahoma City in the championship game, 67–63, to claim the Bulldogs' second NAIA national title and first since 1998.

The tournament was played at the Oman Arena in Jackson, Tennessee.

Qualification

The tournament field remained fixed at thirty-two teams, which were sorted into one of four quadrants and seeded from 1 to 8 within each quadrant. 

The tournament continued to utilize a simple single-elimination format.

Bracket

See also
2005 NAIA Division I men's basketball tournament
2005 NCAA Division I women's basketball tournament
2005 NCAA Division II women's basketball tournament
2005 NCAA Division III women's basketball tournament
2005 NAIA Division II women's basketball tournament

References

NAIA
NAIA Women's Basketball Championships
2005 in sports in Tennessee